Bohdan Romanovych Kozak (born 29 May 2001) is a Ukrainian professional footballer who plays as a central midfielder for Ukrainian club Nyva Ternopil.

References

External links
 
 

2001 births
Living people
People from Mostyska
Ukrainian footballers
Association football midfielders
FC Karpaty Lviv players
FC Karpaty Halych players
FC Nyva Ternopil players
Ukrainian First League players
Ukrainian Second League players
Sportspeople from Lviv Oblast